The Daughters of Union Veterans Civil War Memorial is an outdoor war memorial commemorating Union Civil War veterans, installed at City View Cemetery in Salem, Oregon, United States. The monument, erected by the Oregon Daughters of Union Veterans in 1933, features a statue of a soldier atop pedestal surrounded by two circles with markers honoring veterans. One plaque reads: .

See also
 1933 in art
 List of Union Civil War monuments and memorials

References

External links
 

1933 establishments in Oregon
1933 sculptures
Monuments and memorials in Salem, Oregon
Outdoor sculptures in Salem, Oregon
Sculptures of men in Oregon
Statues in Oregon
Union (American Civil War) monuments and memorials